Vidya Charan Shukla (2 August 1929 – 11 June 2013) was an Indian politician whose political career spanned six decades. He was predominantly a member of the Indian National Congress, but also had spells in Jan Morcha, Janata Dal, Samajwadi Janata Party (Rashtriya), Nationalist Congress Party and Bharatiya Janata Party. He was known as a close associate of Indira Gandhi.

Personal life
Shukla was born on 2 August 1929 in Raipur. His father Ravishankar Shukla was a lawyer, an Indian National Congress politician from Central Provinces and Berar and the first Chief Minister of Madhya Pradesh.  His older brother, Shyama Charan Shukla, was also an INC politician and served as Chief Minister of Madhya Pradesh. He had seven other siblings.

Vidya Charan Shukla graduated from Morris College, Nagpur in 1951. He started Allwyn Cooper Pvt Ltd, which organized big-game safari and photo expeditions of wildlife in the forests of central India.

Political career
In the 1957 general elections, he was elected as a Member of Parliament in the Lok Sabha, on a Indian National Congress ticket from Balodabazar constituency. He became one of the youngest MPs in the 2nd Lok Sabha. Subsequently, he won Lok Sabha elections from Mahasamund in 1962, 1964 (bypoll), 1967, 1980, 1984 and 1989; and from Raipur in 1971 and 1991. He lost from Raipur in 1977 and 1998; and from Mahasamund in 2004. He was elected to Lok Sabha a total of 9 times.

When Indira Gandhi became Prime Minister in 1966, he was chosen as a Minister in her Cabinet. He was Minister of State under Prime Minister Indira Gandhi from 1967 to 1977 including as Minister of State with Independent Charge of Information and Broadcasting.
Despite a versatile career, Shukla's role as Information and Broadcasting Minister during the Emergency period had got him some odium as propagandist for Indira Gandhi’s government. His ministry attracted adverse attention for the media censor policy during that period when Freedom of speech was under attack. The Justice Shah Commission of Inquiry which went into the Emergency excesses, was stunned when V. C. Shukla owned entire responsibility for the functioning of his ministry. He had banned Kishore Kumar's songs on All India Radio because Kishore Kumar had refused to sing at an Indira Gandhi rally. 
He was known for his iron-fist handling of the media during the Emergency.He was also a minister in Rajiv Gandhi lead Congress government, but left and joined the revolt against Rajiv Gandhi in the mid-1980s and was one of the founders of Jan Morcha along with Arun Nehru, V.P. Singh and Arif Mohammad Khan. He later became a minister in the National Front government of 1989-90 under V.P. Singh and switched allegiance to join the subsequent Chandrasekhar government and served as Minister for External Affairs of India during 1990-91 under Prime Minister Chandra Shekhar, during the Lok Sabha as a member of Janata Dal. 
He again returned to Congress Party and also served as Cabinet Minister under Prime Minister P.V. Narasimha Rao during 1991-96 as Minister of Parliamentary Affairs and Minister of Irrigation.  in 2003 he shifted to Nationalist Congress Party and headed the Chhattisgarh Unit of NCP.  However, he changed his political allegiance and joined BJP towards end of 2003,  but in 2004 Lok Sabha elections he himself lost on the BJP ticket from Mahasamund against Ajit Jogi of INC.  After the defeat he resigned from BJP in 2004.
From 2004 he was in a political state of limbo and was trying to return to Congress Party until finally in 2007 when Sonia Gandhi, the Congress leader, approved his return to the Congress party. He was in Congress from 2007 until his death in 2013

Death
Vidya Charan Shukla was part of Congress Party's Parivartan Yatra in Chhattisgarh, when he was injured in Naxal attack on 25 May 2013. He was later moved to Medanta at Gurgaon, where he succumbed to his injuries on 11 June 2013.

President Pranab Mukherjee in his condolence message said Vidya Charan Shukla was a veteran Parliamentarian, able administrator and an outstanding statesman. Shekhar Dutt, the Chhattisgarh Governor said his death marks the end of an era. Several leaders including then Prime Minister, Manmohan Singh, Sonia Gandhi, Lal Krishna Advani and others, cutting across party lines paid tribute to him and many national leaders were present at his last rites.

The newly elected Chhattisgarh government has set up an SIT to probe into the incident which caused his death.
He is survived by his wife and three daughters.

See also
 List of assassinated Indian politicians

References

1929 births
2013 deaths
Ministers for Information and Broadcasting of India
Ministers for External Affairs of India
Assassinated Indian politicians
People murdered in Chhattisgarh
Indian murder victims
Terrorism victims in India
Deaths by firearm in India
People from Raipur, Chhattisgarh
India MPs 1957–1962
India MPs 1962–1967
India MPs 1967–1970
India MPs 1971–1977
India MPs 1980–1984
India MPs 1984–1989
India MPs 1989–1991
India MPs 1991–1996
Indian National Congress politicians from Chhattisgarh
Lok Sabha members from Madhya Pradesh
People of the Emergency (India)
Janata Dal politicians
Bharatiya Janata Party politicians from Chhattisgarh
V. P. Singh administration
Chandra Shekhar administration
Rao administration
Indira Gandhi administration
Nationalist Congress Party politicians from Chhattisgarh
Lok Sabha members from Chhattisgarh
Samajwadi Janata Party politicians
Politicians from Raipur
Indian sports executives and administrators